Vincent Gembalies (born 18 January 2000) is a German professional footballer who plays as a centre-back for MSV Duisburg.

Career
Gembalies made his professional debut for MSV Duisburg in the 2. Bundesliga on 9 March 2019, coming on as a half-time substitute for Enis Hajri in the match against Jahn Regensburg, which finished as a 1–1 away draw. He extended his contract on 11 June 2019. Another three-year extension was signed in June 2021.

Career statistics

References

External links

Profile at kicker.de

2000 births
Living people
German footballers
Association football central defenders
MSV Duisburg players
2. Bundesliga players
Sportspeople from Oberhausen
Footballers from North Rhine-Westphalia